The 2023 All-Ireland Under-20 Hurling Championship is scheduled to be the fifth staging of the All-Ireland Under-20 Championship and the 59th staging overall of a hurling championship for players between the minor and senior grades. The championship is scheduled to run from March to May 2023.

Kilkenny will enter the championship as defending champions.

Leinster Under-20 Hurling Championship

Leinster quarter-finals

Leinster semi-finals

Leinster final

Munster Under-20 Hurling Championship

Munster table

{| class="wikitable" style="text-align:center"
!width=20|
!width=150 style="text-align:left;"|Team
!width=20|
!width=20|
!width=20|
!width=20|
!width=40|
!width=40|
!width=20|
!width=20|
|- style="background:#ccffcc"
|1||align=left| Clare ||0||0||0||0||0||0||0||0
|- style="background:#FFFFE0"
|2||align=left| Cork ||0||0||0||0||0||0||0||0
|- style="background:#FFFFE0"
|3||align=left| Limerick ||0||0||0||0||0||0||0||0
|-
|4||align=left| Tipperary ||0||0||0||0||0||0||0||0
|-
|5||align=left| Waterford ||0||0||0||0||0||0||0||0
|}

Munster round 1

Munster round 2

Munster round 3

Munster round 4

Munster round 5

Munster semi-final

Munster final

All-Ireland Under-20 Hurling Championship

All-Ireland final

References

Under-20
All-Ireland Under-20 Hurling Championship